The 1998 Junior League World Series took place from August 17–22 in Taylor, Michigan, United States. Mission Viejo, California defeated Waco, Texas twice in the championship game.

Teams

Results

References

Junior League World Series
Junior League World Series